"Heart of Stone" is the fifth episode of the Once Upon a Time spin-off series Once Upon a Time in Wonderland.

Plot
In the past, Scarlet and Anastasia go through the Looking Glass into Wonderland only to find it is not completely what they expected. Anastasia gains a royal status throughout Wonderland after accepting a deal with the Red King. In the present time, the Red Queen makes a deal with Alice to gain special magic dust that only someone pure of heart can claim, while the White Rabbit is forced to work for Jafar.

Production
Katie Wech was the writer for the episode, while Paul Edwards was its director.

Reception

Ratings
The episode was watched by 3.73 million American viewers, and received an 18-49 rating/share of 0.9/3, roughly the same as the previous episode. The show placed fifth in its timeslot and thirteenth for the night.

Critical reception
Amy Ratcliffe of IGN gave the episode a 5.9 out of 10, giving it a mixed review. She said "Tonight's installment of Wonderland had some fun moments but was mostly predictable. It wasn't horrible, but also not awesome. The story at least moved forward so Cyrus and Alice are closer to being together. Additionally, Sophie Lowe and Emma Rigby offered some good character moments. They weren't enough to carry the episode though."

Christine Orlando of TV Fanatic gave the episode a 4.3 out of 5, signaling positive reviews.

Lily Sparks of TV.com gave the episode a positive review, saying "All in all, this was a pleasant, simple episode that added a few layers of emotional complexity to one of the series’ most cartoonish characters. The Red Queen definitely needed some characteristics beyond "evil" and "sexy," and we got them. I do wish that this episode had been front-loaded to air earlier in the season—it would've been nice to see more of the Knave and the Red Queen's backstory in the pilot, and the classically styled Alice and the general creepiness would've been a lot more engaging than the marshmallow swamp and terrible animated caterpillar and all that foolishness we endured in the first two episodes."

References

External links
 

2013 American television episodes
Once Upon a Time in Wonderland episodes